"I Want You" is a song written and performed by Swedish recording artists Marie Fredriksson and Per Gessle (Roxette), Mauro Scocco and Johan Ekelund (Ratata) and solo artist Eva Dahlgren, and was co-written and produced by Anders Glenmark. It was recorded in June 1987, immediately prior to the commencement of "Rock Runt Riket" ("Rock Around the Kingdom"), a 15-date joint tour of Sweden. It was performed by all three acts together as an encore during every date of the tour.

The single was limited to just 750 copies on 7" vinyl, which were exclusively sold at the venue on the night of each concert date. The song has never been included on a studio or compilation album released by any of the artists involved, and is considered the rarest release ever issued by Roxette.

Formats and track listings
 7" single (TATI-7)
 "I Want You" – 4:37
 "I Want You"  – 3:30

Personnel
 Audio engineering — Lennart Östlund
 Audio mastering — Olle Ramm
 Bass — Matts Alsberg
 Drums — Per "Pelle" Alsing
 Guitar — Henrik Janson
 Keyboards — Clarence Öfwerman
 Vocals — Eva Dahlgren, Mauro Scocco, Johan Ekelund, Marie Fredriksson and Per Gessle

References

1987 singles
Roxette songs
Songs written by Per Gessle
Songs written by Anders Glenmark
1987 songs
Songs written by Mauro Scocco